Per capita income (PCI) or total income measures the average income earned per person in a given area (city, region, country, etc.) in a specified year. It is calculated by dividing the area's total income by its total population.

Per capita income is national income divided by population size. Per capita income is often used to measure a sector's average income and compare the wealth of different populations. Per capita income is also often used to measure a country's standard of living. It is usually expressed in terms of a commonly used international currency such as the euro or United States dollar, and is useful because it is widely known, is easily calculable from readily available gross domestic product (GDP) and population estimates, and produces a useful statistic for comparison of wealth between sovereign territories. This helps to ascertain a country's development status. It is one of the three measures for calculating the Human Development Index  of a country. Per capita income is also called average income.

Critics
Critics often cite the following drawbacks to the use of per capita income:
 Comparisons of per capita income over time need to consider inflation. Without adjusting for inflation, figures tend to overstate the effects of economic growth.
 International comparisons can be distorted by cost of living differences not reflected in exchange rates. Where the objective is to compare living standards between countries, adjusting for differences in purchasing power parity will more accurately reflect what people are actually able to buy with their money.
 It is a mean value and does not reflect income distribution. If a country's income distribution is skewed, a small wealthy class can increase per capita income substantially while the majority of the population has no change in income. In this respect, median income is more useful when measuring of prosperity than per capita income, as it is less influenced by outliers.
 Non-monetary activity, such as barter or services provided within the family, is usually not counted. The importance of these services varies widely among economies.
 Per capita income does not consider whether income is invested in factors likely to improve the area's development, such as health, education, or infrastructure.

See also
 List of countries by average wage
 List of countries by GDP (nominal) per capita—GDP at market or government official exchange rates per inhabitant
 List of countries by GDP (PPP) per capita—GDP calculated at purchasing power parity (PPP) exchange per inhabitant
 List of countries by GNI (nominal) per capita
 List of countries by GNI (PPP) per capita
 List of countries by income equality
 Total personal income
 List of U.S. states by adjusted per capita personal income

Gross domestic product